KDQN (1390 AM) is a radio station broadcasting a Spanish music format. Licensed to De Queen, Arkansas, United States. The station is currently owned by Jay W. Bunyard & Teresa Bunyard, through licensee Bunyard Broadcasting, Inc.

References

External links

DQN
DQN